Bell Bajao (Hindi for 'ring the bell') is an anti-domestic violence campaign that urges local residents to take a stand against physical abuse through simple acts meant to interrupt domestic violence.  When residents, especially men, overhear violence against a woman taking place, they are urged to ring the doorbell and ask a simple question - such as to borrow some tea, to use the phone, or to have a glass of water. This is meant to let the abuser know that others can hear them and will act to interrupt the violence.

The campaign was launched in India on August 20, 2008 by Breakthrough in collaboration with the Ministry of Women and Child Development, UNIFEM and the UN Trust Fund. The global campaign, known in English as "Ring The Bell," was launched at the Clinton Global Initiative.  United Nations Secretary General Ban Ki-moon joined the campaign as the inaugural global “champion,” and Breakthrough will join forces with his UNiTE to End Violence Against Women campaign as its first global partner.

This campaign promotes individual action against domestic violence. The campaign featured award-winning Public Service Announcements, as well as media and training tools. The campaign targets boys and men and calls on them to intervene if they witness domestic violence. A key aspect of the campaign was thinking of men as partners in ending domestic violence, instead of only as violators. The PSAs reached over 130 million people. Like the "Is This Justice?" campaign, this campaign was produced pro bono by the advertising agency Ogilvy and Mather and directed by Bauddhayan Mukherji of Little Lamb Films.

Breakthrough 
Breakthrough is an international human rights organization using the power of popular culture, media, and community mobilization to transform public attitudes and advance equality, justice, and dignity. "Restore Fairness" (urges U.S. government to restore due process to US immigration system), "Is this justice" (about domestic violence) and "What kind of man are you" (about HIV/AIDS and condom usage) are other initiatives in the United States. Most recently, Breakthrough created America 2049 a Facebook game set in a dystopic alternative future which deals with issues of immigration, sex trafficking, and labor rights. Breakthrough addresses critical global issues including violence against women, sexuality and HIV/AIDS, racial justice, and immigrant rights.

The Bell Bajao! campaign, rolled out by the organization in 2008, was a serious call to end domestic violence. With the help of television, radio, and print ads in addition to community awareness programs across India, Bell Bajao! has reached more than 130 million people. The campaigns also features mobile video van that travelled to three states in India-Karnatka, Maharastra and Uttar Pradesh in addition to 6 advertisements that were aired on all major television channels. Mobile van activity was supported by interviews and views from leading personalities and celebrities for the ‘Bell Bajao-Champion Voices’ initiative. Also, the champions were eminent figures from various walks of life who are seen as inspiring models who can drive change in society. The video van activities helped to reach out 5.5 million people in four districts of Karnatka. The campaign majorly targeted men and boys and engaged them to play a more pro-active role in preventing domestic violence and the awareness and intervention campaign which was funded by UN Women and implemented by Breakthrough Trust.

The video van promoted helpline numbers 103 and 1298 and will have an engaging emcee, audio visual appeal, street theatre group, interactive gender bender games and celebratory champion voices and pamphlets. The campaign also won a reputed award in the Film Lions category of Cannes Advertising Festival for the advertisement titled "The Bus Driver", which was based on the real-life incident in Aurangabad district of Maharashtra, where a bus driver refused to play a passive role as a woman was beaten up by her husband.

In addition to above initiatives, around 23 workshops and public education activities were conducted with 575 staff and members of NGO, CBO, and the positive people’s network in Karnataka and Uttar Pradesh to enhance their understanding of the issue.

Focus 
Violence against Women – every person in this world is entitled to a fundamental set of human rights that allow her or him to live with dignity and self-respect. For too long, women have been regarded as less than human, and therefore, not entitled to these human rights. Breakthrough works to transform attitudes towards women so that they can realize their full potential. One key example is the Breakthrough Mann Ke Manjeere music video that has become a cult classic that speaks to woman’s celebration of self-discovery and the ability to make choices in life. The Bell Bajao! campaign brought attention to domestic violence through a powerful series of PSAs which focused attention to this issue.

Creating awareness 
Breakthrough uses innovative tools to engage youth and create a culture of human rights. Here are a few ways that Breakthrough spreads the Bell Bajao! message throughout the country:

 Celebrity involvement: the actor Boman Irani who is brand ambassador for this campaign weaves in men into the initiative saying that men can stop domestic violence by becoming sensitized and involved in the issue.
 Television, radio and press: 32 million people have seen and heard the message of Bell Bajao. Through television, radio and press. Television advertisements depict men and boys who hear domestic violence and take a minute out their everyday lives to intervene and stop the violence.
 Video Vans: mobile vans have been on the road for 150 days, traveling 80,000 kilometers across 6 districts in Uttar Pradesh, Karnataka and Maharashtra and have exposed 2.7 million people to this burning issue. Innovative and interactive, the van built audience-participation through games, street theater, audio visual tools and quizzes.
 Interactive, dedicated website: breakthrough’s ground-breaking blog on www.bellbajao.org provides a platform – previously nonexistent in India – for dialogue about domestic violence. To date, witnesses, victims and advocates have all had an open space for personal testimony and reflection.
 Leadership Training: the Rights Advocates program embodies on-the-ground youth and community leadership training to reaffirm the message of Bell Bajao! and help Indian youth recognize and fight domestic violence in their own communities. The training develop the capacity and life skills of the trainees on a variety of complex like human rights, gender based violence and reproductive health. In 2008, the program trained over 100,000 people and aims to double its reach in 2009.

Awards and recognition

 Silver Lion, Cannes Film Festival (Bell Bajao), 2010
 Silver at the London International Advertising Awards 2010
 Official Selection, Festival Du Cannes, Short Film Corner 2010 
 Gold and Silver at Goafest, (Bell Bajao), 2009
 Gold at Spikes Asia 2010
 Gold at Spikes Asia 2009
 One Show Merit 2009
 One Show Merit 2010
 Young Achiever's Award from Advertising Club of Bombay (Bell Bajao), (O & M's Ryan Mendonca), 2009
 Best Integrated Campaign of the Year, Creative Abby Awards at Goafest for Public Service, Appeals and Charity (Bell Bajao), 2009
 Laadli Awards (Little Lamb Film's Bauddhayan Mukherji) 2010
 Manthan award in 2011, started by the Digital Empowerment Foundation

References

External links
 Breakthrough, Official website
 Bell Bajao, Official website

Non-profit organisations based in India
Violence against women in India